Paullinia paullinioides is a flowering plant species in the genus of Paullinia found in South America. It was first described in 1895, by Ludwig Adolph Timotheus Radlkofer.

Description
Paullinia paullinioides is a tropical liana.

Distribution
Paullinia paullinioides is found in the Amazon Basin in Brazil, Colombia, Ecuador and Peru. It has also been observed in Venezuela.

Ecology
The species is host to the Muscodor vitigenus fungus that produces nearly pure naphthalene which acts as an insect repellent.

References

Plants described in 1895
Flora of the Amazon
Flora of Colombia
Flora of Peru
Flora of Venezuela
paulliniodes